This is a round-up of the 1971 Sligo Senior Football Championship. St. Patrick's, Dromard claimed their third title, and completed back-to-back wins in the process. Tubbercurry returned to the final after a 14-year absence, but it was in vain, as St. Patrick's cantered to an easy victory, with Micheal Kearins, who became Sligo's first All-Star recipient later that year, leading the winners' onslaught.

First round

Quarter-finals

Semi-finals

Sligo Senior Football Championship Final

References

 Sligo Champion (Autumn 1971)

Sligo Senior Football Championship
Sligo